Sadanand Singh (21 May 1943 – 8 September 2021) was an Indian politician. He was the former Speaker of the Bihar Assembly.

References

1943 births
2021 deaths
Indian politicians
Indian National Congress politicians
Members of the Bihar Legislative Assembly
People from Bhagalpur district
Indian National Congress politicians from Bihar